Smooth Talk is a 1985 film directed by Joyce Chopra, loosely based on Joyce Carol Oates' short story "Where Are You Going, Where Have You Been?" (1966), which was in turn inspired by the Tucson murders committed by Charles Schmid. The protagonist and main character, Connie Wyatt, is played by Laura Dern. The antagonist, Arnold Friend, is played by Treat Williams.

The film was produced by American Playhouse and Goldcrest Films, and originally released to movie theaters in 1985. The original music score was composed by Russ Kunkel and Bill Payne. The film won the Grand Jury Prize in the Dramatic category at the 1986 Sundance Festival.

Plot 
Connie Wyatt is a restless 15-year-old who is anxious to explore the pleasures of her sexual awakening. Before she enters her sophomore year in high school, she spends the summer moping around her family farmhouse. She suffers from the put-downs of her mother, Katherine, while hearing nothing but praise for her older sister, June. Her father Harry somehow manages to float around the family tensions. Connie also helps paint the cottage, just as her mother constantly demands her to.

Connie passes the time cruising the local shopping mall with her friends and flirting with boys. However, when an actual date leads to heavy petting, she escapes from the boy's car. She frequents a hamburger joint popular with locals, where unbeknownst to her, an older man observes her with interest. One night as she leaves, the man playfully tells Connie, "I'm watching you!" Connie and her mother get into an argument about her going out at night and being careful with whom she flirts, which results in Katherine slapping Connie when she brings up how Katherine became a young mother. Connie declines to attend a barbecue with her family that afternoon and is left alone in the house.

Later, the same man who was watching Connie approaches the house in a 1960s convertible. The side of his car is painted with the name "A. Friend", and he identifies himself as Arnold Friend. Besides dressing and behaving like James Dean, he also name-drops several teenybopper acts, even though he appears to be in his thirties. Although he initially comes off as kind and friendly, he gradually adopts  a sinister demeanor, alternating between speaking to Connie in a warm, seductive voice and shouting insults to his fellow car passenger when he inquires about a phone. Arnold informs Connie about how he has been watching her and that he knows all about her, recounting the details about her family's barbecue plans with startling accuracy. He then begins speaking about how he could be her lover. Connie orders him to leave, but he coerces her into going on a drive with him by threatening to burn down the house. His friend stays behind as they head off in his car.

When Connie returns home, she is bewildered and disheveled, and informs Arnold that she never wants to see him again. It is left ambiguous whether or not he raped her; it is implied that she isn't the same person she was at the film's beginning. When Connie's family returns from the barbecue, her mother tearfully apologizes to her for slapping her earlier that day, but Connie reassures her that everything is all right. At the film's ending, she doesn't inform June about what happened, but dances with her to James Taylor's recording of the song "Handy Man".

Cast

 Treat Williams as Arnold Friend
 Laura Dern as Connie Wyatt
 Mary Kay Place as Katherine Wyatt
 Margaret Welsh as Laura
 Sara Inglis as Jill
 Levon Helm as Harry Wyatt
 Elizabeth Berridge as June Wyatt
 Geoff Hoyle as Ellie
 William Ragsdale as Jeff
 David Berridge as Eddie
 Cab Covay as Pick-up driver
 Michael French as Stan
 Joy Carlin as Laura's mother
 Mark McKay as Bobby King
 Carl Mueller as Mall Boy

Production
The short story "Where Are You Going, Where Have You Been?" by Joyce Carol Oates was adapted by playwright Tom Cole, Joyce Chopra's husband. Among the contributions Cole and Chopra added to the story was a fleshing out of the family relationships between Connie, her parents, and her sister. Laura Dern was not cast until two weeks before filming. Filming of Smooth Talk took place in northern California in the cities of Sebastopol and Santa Rosa.

Release and reception
Goldcrest Films invested £516,000 in the film and received £635,000 earning them a profit of £119,000. It screened at the 1986 Sundance Film Festival where it won the Grand Jury Prize. The film was given a limited release in American theaters and continued to be unreleased on VHS and DVD for years thereafter due to going through different distributors.

On Rotten Tomatoes, Smooth Talk holds a rating of 92% from 24 reviews. Roger Ebert, who awarded the film 3.5 stars out of 4, described it as "almost uncanny in its self-assurance".

Re-release 
The film was given a 4K restoration by The Criterion Collection in September 2020 and was screened at the New York Film Festival that month to critical acclaim. Janus Films gave the film a general re-release that November. Writing of the restored film, Richard Brody of The New Yorker said, "Chopra strikes an astoundingly tactile, intimate vision of Connie’s terror together with the burdens of self-doubt and silence that she endures—and that predators foster. The film’s power is enormous throughout; spare means (long-held closeups, a four-minute take of sisterly confessions) evoke a drama that seems to have been filmed holding its breath."

Marshall Shaffer of Slant Magazine wrote "the film adequately recognizes the thin line between male seduction and coercion." Jake Cole, also of Slant, awarded the film 3.5 stars, saying "Dern nails the devastation of a woman learning how evil and exploitative the world of men can be, and just as David Lynch’s film [Blue Velvet] ended on a note of society’s mask of civilized jollity reasserting itself in the face of deeper awareness, so, too, does Smooth Talk conclude with Connie, faced with no recourse to change anything, find a way to compartmentalize her rude awakening for the sake of survival."

Home media
The film was released on DVD by MGM Home Entertainment on December 7, 2004. The film was released on Blu-ray for the first time by Olive Films on November 24, 2015. The Criterion Collection released a special edition Blu-ray & DVD of the film on February 23, 2021. The edition is a two-disc set which includes Chopra’s short films, retrospective interviews with the director and cast, and behind-the-scenes featurettes.

References

External links 
 
 
 
Smooth Talk: Girl Power an essay by Honor Moore at the Criterion Collection
Interview with Joyce Chopra about Smooth Talk at Another Magazine

1985 films
1985 directorial debut films
1985 romantic drama films
1980s coming-of-age drama films
American coming-of-age drama films
American romantic drama films
British coming-of-age drama films
British romantic drama films
Films based on short fiction
Films directed by Joyce Chopra
Films set in California
Films shot in California
Teensploitation
American Playhouse
Sundance Film Festival award winners
American independent films
1985 independent films
Films about adolescence
Films about mother–daughter relationships
Films about puberty
Juvenile sexuality in films
Goldcrest Films films
1980s English-language films
1980s American films
1980s British films